"Treachery" is the eighth episode of the American television series Revenge. It premiered on ABC on November 16, 2011.

It was written by Ryan Scott and directed by Bobby Roth.

Plot
Lydia Davis (Amber Valletta) comes out of her coma, but doesn't remember anything about what happened.  Suspicions of Emily Thorne (Emily VanCamp) are amplified by Victoria Grayson (Madeleine Stowe).  Tyler (Ashton Holmes) begins to realize their dirty plans. Emily's plot further unravels, and Victoria's unstable relationship with her family grows increasingly more tense when the real Emily Thorne, an unwanted pawn (Margarita Levieva) in Emily's game, heads to the Hamptons with questionable intentions. Meanwhile, Lydia's memory is a growing concern for the Graysons, and a recently embittered friend begins to play dirty.

Production
The episode was written by Ryan Scott and directed by Bobby Roth.

Ratings
The episode received 18-49 rating of 2.6/7 and was watched by 7.98 million viewers.

External links 
 

Revenge (TV series) episodes
2011 American television episodes
Television episodes directed by Bobby Roth